Aganisia cyanea (formerly Acacallis cyanea) is a showy species of orchid native to Colombia, Venezuela, Peru and Brazil and widely cultivated elsewhere as an ornamental. It is remarkable because some cultivars of this species produce blue flowers, the color blue being quite rare among the orchids. They are considered difficult to maintain in cultivation without a controlled growing environment.

Biology 
Aganisia cyanea is found in very wet, lowland rain forests in northern South America growing on lower sections of the trunks of large trees. The plants can be submerged under water during monsoons for several weeks due to flooding in habitat with no apparent harm.

The plants grow from a creeping rhizome with inter-spaced pseudobulbs with one apical, usually pleated leaf.  These plants bloom from the base of the pseudobulbs, and produce a raceme of up to 10 flowers.

The flowers of these plants have a metallic, almost surreal appearance and appear to be made of bluish metal. This is very striking. The flowers take on a more bluish cast when not exposed to direct sunlight.

Cultivation 

In cultivation, they are best accommodated on tree fern or cork bark slabs mounted bare root and given high humidity and abundant water and feeding year round, and moderate shade.  They prefer moderate to warm temperatures.

The species is much sought after in cultivation because of its blue metallic flowers. These plants are protected under CITES II and local and regional laws and should not be removed or disturbed in habitat.

The plants are available commercially from flasked seedlings of varieties that are amenable to cultivation and these plants are easily obtainable.

Flora and flowers

Illustrations

References

External links 
 
 

cyanea
Orchids of Brazil
Orchids of Colombia
Orchids of Venezuela
Orchids of Peru
Epiphytic orchids
Plants described in 1853